Nentaro Gantu Kallaro (Kannada: ನೆಂಟರೋ ಗಂಟು ಕಳ್ಳರೋ) is a 1979 Indian Kannada film, directed by A. V. Sheshagiri Rao and produced by G. N. Lakshmipathy. The film stars Vishnuvardhan, Aarathi, K. S. Ashwath and Balakrishna in lead roles. The film had musical score by G. K. Venkatesh.

Cast

Vishnuvardhan
Aarathi
K. S. Ashwath
Balakrishna
Dinesh
Musuri Krishnamurthy
Sundar Krishna Urs
Seetharam
Dheerendra Gopal
Kunigal Ramanath
Babu
Appu
Raghavachar
Shanthala
Theresamma
Saroja
Geetha
Prema
Baby Shakunthala
Baby Geetha
Master Girimurthy
Master Raju
T. R. Narasimharaju

References

External links
 

1979 films
1970s Kannada-language films
Films scored by G. K. Venkatesh
Films directed by A. V. Seshagiri Rao